The 1978 Oregon State Beavers football team represented Oregon State University in the Pacific-10 Conference (Pac-10) during the 1978 NCAA Division I-A football season.  In their third season under head coach Craig Fertig, the Beavers compiled a 3–7–1 record (2–6 in Pac-10, ninth), and were outscored 266 to 128.  The team played its five home games on campus at Parker Stadium in Corvallis.

Schedule

References

External links
Sports-Reference – 1978 Oregon State Beavers
Game program: Oregon State at Washington State – November 4, 1978

Oregon State
Oregon State Beavers football seasons
Oregon State Beavers football